The Alizai rebellion of 1923 was a rebellion by the Alizai tribe in the region of Zamindawar, in modern-day Helmand Province of the Emirate of Afghanistan, which took place in 1923. The causes laid in opposition to the reforms of Amanullah Khan, namely in regards to conscription and taxation. The rebellion lasted 6 months, largely due to the fact that none of the conscripted battalions in the south were willing to fight the Alizai. Ultimately, the rebellion was defeated with troops from Herat, who executed rebel leaders and deported groups of Zamindawaris to Afghan Turkestan.

Notes

References

Further reading 

1923 in Afghanistan
Conflicts in 1923
Military history of Afghanistan
Rebellions in Afghanistan